The 1896 LSU Tigers football team represented Louisiana State University (LSU) during the 1896 Southern Intercollegiate Athletic Association football season. This was LSU's first season playing as a member of the Southern Intercollegiate Athletic Association (SIAA). The Tigers, led by coach Allen Jeardeau, went undefeated and were the SIAA co-champions. It was LSU's second undefeated season in football. The 1896 team was also the first LSU team to use the nickname "Tigers".

Before the season
Allen Jeardeau was hired as head coach.

Schedule

Roster

† -Team Captain
Roster from Fanbase.com and LSU: The Louisiana Tigers

Game summaries

Centenary

LSU easily defeated Centenary 46–0. Robertson went around right end for the first touchdown. The starting lineup was Westbrook (left end), Nicholson (left tackle), Huyck (left guard), Atkinson (center), Scott (right guard), Robertson (right tackle), Slaughter (right end), Gourrier (quarterback), J. Daspit (left halfback), A. Daspit (right halfback), Lambert (fullback).

Tulane

The Tulane game of this year was forfeited during the game due to Tulane having fielded an ineligible player.  At the time that the game was declared forfeit, Tulane was leading with a score of 2 to nothing.  About 10 minutes into the second half, LSU was moving the ball toward the goal line when a Tulane player named Depleche was injured.  The injured player was replaced by George H. Brooke.  LSU ran another play and gained 5 yards before realizing the identity of this substitute Tulane player.  LSU's team captain, Edwin A. Scott protested to the game's referee, Lieutenant Wall.  Scott cited the rules of the SIAA and the mutual pre-game agreement between the schools as reasons that Brooke should be declared ineligible to play.  Tulane's team captain, Louis J. Genella, refused to take Brooke out of the game and stated that Tulane refused to play without him.  After a lengthy debate, the referee ruled that Brooke could not play, and that Tulane forfeited the game by refusing to play without him.

During the debate, Tulane argued that Brooke, who was previously a two time All-American at Pennsylvania, planned to enroll as a graduate student at Tulane.  Brooke refused to sign an affidavit stating his intention to enroll at Tulane, as he was already enrolled in law school at the University of Pennsylvania.  Due to the forfeiture, the official score was set at LSU 6, Tulane 0.  Dr. William Dudley, President of the SIAA, later ruled that the game referee was right to declare the game forfeited and that men planning to enter a school were not eligible to play.  Dudley ruled that prospective players should be enrolled for two weeks before being allowed to play in a game.

Ole Miss

LSU defeated Ole Miss 12–6. The game was "close and hard" for the first ten minutes, then LSU made a touchdown. LSU scored again in the second half after continuous gains. Then Ole Miss scored late, "by the hardest sort of playing". The extra point attempt hit the crossbar.

The starting lineup was A. Daspit (left end), Arrighi (left tackle), Huyck (left guard), Chavanne (center), Schneider (right guard), Scott (right tackle), Slaughter (right end), J. Daspit (quarterback), Schoenberger (left halfback), Gourrier (right halfback), Nicholson (fullback).

Texas

The Cadets defeated the Texas team 14–0. Sam Gourrier made the first touchdown around Texas' left end. The Times Picayune reported "The cadets are wild tonight over the victory".

Mississippi A&M

The Cadets slaughtered the Mississippi Aggies 52–0.

Southern A. C.

On a cold, dreary day, LSU defeated the Southern Athletic Club 6–0 to secure the state championship. LSU's Robertson got the deciding touchdown. Rain started to pour as soon as the game ended.

Postseason
LSU and Pop Warner's Georgia team tied for the SIAA title. Harper's Weekly reported that, aside from the Tulane game, the season was a very clean one. LSU played no ineligible players, was never penalized for slugging, and never complained about the officiating.

References

LSU
LSU Tigers football seasons
College football undefeated seasons
LSU Tigers football